Cyme basitesselata is a moth of the subfamily Arctiinae.

Taxonomy
It was originally described as Asura basitesselata by Walter Rothschild in 1913. The Global Lepidoptera Names Index (LepIndex) lists basitessellata as a junior subjunctive synonym of Lyclene quadrilineata Pagenstecher, 1886. Lepidoptera and Some Other Life Forms lists Asura basitessellata as a synonym of Asura quadrilineata (Pagenstecher, 1886).

It is found in New Guinea.

References

Moths described in 1913
Nudariina
Moths of Asia